Stine Østergaard Jørgensen (born 3 September 1990) is a Danish handball player for København Håndbold.

She was the team captain of the national team and participated at the 2011 World Women's Handball Championship in Brazil.

In May 2020, she announced her retirement from the Danish national team.

Club career
She started playing handball at the age of 5 years, for her hometown Dronninglund. When she was 16 years old, she moved to the Danish top club Aalborg DH, where she also represented the youth team. In Aalborg DH, she received silver in the Danish Women's Handball League in 2009.

She moved to FC Midtjylland Håndbold in the summer 2013, after Aalborg DH dealt with economic problems and went bankrupt. She participated at the 2013–14 EHF Women's Champions League Final Four and won several titles and merits in the Danish League and the Danish Cup.

Jørgensen moved to Odense Håndbold in 2017, after spending four years for FC Midtjylland Håndbold. Three years later in 2020, she signed a 2-year contract with German SG BBM Bietigheim.

Achievements

International
World Championship:
Bronze Medalist: 2013

Domestic
Damehåndboldligaen:
Winner: 2015, 2015
Silver Medalist: 2009, 2014, 2016, 2018, 2020
Bronze Medalist: 2017, 2019
Danish Cup:
Winner: 2014, 2015
Finalist: 2016, 2018, 2019
Bundesliga:
Winner: 2022

Continental
EHF Cup Winners' Cup:
Winner: 2015
EHF European League:
Winner: 2022

Personal life
She is married to the Danish Badminton player Jan Ø. Jørgensen.

References

External links

1990 births
Living people
Danish female handball players
People from Brønderslev Municipality
FCM Håndbold players
Sportspeople from the North Jutland Region